William Callahan DeKoning (December 19, 1918 – July 26, 1979) was a Major League Baseball catcher who played in three games for the New York Giants in .

External links

Major League Baseball catchers
New York Giants (NL) players
Americus Pioneers players
Dayton Wings players
Jacksonville Tars players
Johnstown Johnnies players
Richmond Colts players
Trenton Packers players
Baseball players from New York (state)
1918 births
1979 deaths